The men's 200 metres event at the 2011 Summer Universiade was held on 18–19 August.

Medalists

Results

Heats
Qualification: First 3 in each heat (Q) and the next 7 fastest (q) qualified for the quarterfinals.

Wind:Heat 1: -1.0 m/s, Heat 2: -0.5 m/s, Heat 3: -1.0 m/s, Heat 4: -0.1 m/s, Heat 5: -0.4 m/s, Heat 6: +0.1 m/sHeat 7: -0.1 m/s, Heat 8: -0.3 m/s, Heat 9: +1.2 m/s, Heat 10: +1.1 m/s, Heat 11: +0.4 m/s

Quarterfinals
Qualification: First 3 in each heat (Q) and the next 1 fastest (q) qualified for the semifinals.

Wind:Heat 1: 0.0 m/s, Heat 2: -1.0 m/s, Heat 3: 0.0 m/s, Heat 4: +0.2 m/s, Heat 5: -0.3 m/s

Semifinals
Qualification: First 4 of each semifinal qualified directly (Q) for the final.

Wind:Heat 1: -0.1 m/s, Heat 2: 0.0 m/s

Final
Wind: -0.3 m/s

References
Heats results
Quarterfinals results
Semifinals results
Final results

200
2011